Notte italiana (internationally released as Italian Night) is a 1987 Italian comedy drama film directed by Carlo Mazzacurati. It won several awards including the Grand Prix at the Annecy Film Festival, the Nastro d'Argento for Best New Director and the Globo d'oro for Best Actor (to Marco Messeri).

Cast 
 Marco Messeri: Otello
 Giulia Boschi: Daria
 Mario Adorf: Tornova
 Roberto Citran: Gàbor 
 Memè Perlini: Francesco aka 'Checco' 
 Remo Remotti: Italo
 Tino Carraro: Melandri

References

External links

1987 films
1987 comedy-drama films
Films directed by Carlo Mazzacurati
1987 directorial debut films
1987 comedy films
1987 drama films
Italian comedy-drama films
Films scored by Fiorenzo Carpi
Italian multilingual films
1980s Italian-language films
1980s Italian films